Honesto Mayoralgo (August 5, 1934 – August 17, 1985) was a former Filipino basketball player and coach.

Nes or Mayo, as his friends called him, was one of the more popular Ateneo Blue Eagles from high school in 1949 through college in 1955 and was a standout member of the Ateneo NCAA champion team in 1953. Mayoralgo also played for the Seven-Up team that won the 1955 MICAA championship. After his active-playing days, Nes turned to coaching and steered the Philippine Youth quintet to the 1977 Asian Youth championship held in Kuwait. He was coach of the Manilabank team in the MICAA for several years.

Until the time of his death nine days after his 51st birthday, Nes was the Basketball Association of the Philippines' vice-president for operations. Prior to this, he served as technical assistant to the BAP president and was the BAP Secretary-General.

References

External links
Ateneo Blue Eagles - Notable basketball players

1934 births
1985 deaths
Filipino men's basketball players
Ateneo Blue Eagles men's basketball players
Philippines men's national basketball team coaches